Eduard Rottmanner (2 September 1809 – 4 May 1843) was a German composer and organist.

Rottmanner was born in Munich and was the cousin of German poet, philosopher, and politician Karl Rottmanner, and the great-nephew of lawyer Simon Rottmanner. He studied the organ and music composition with Joseph Graetz and Caspar Ett. In 1828 he entered the University of Munich where he studied philosophy, logic, history, physics, and statistics. During that time he continued taking music lessons privately and held organist posts at various churches in Munich, including the Bürgersaalkirche, the Herzogspitalkirche, and St. Michael's Church, Munich. In 1839 he was appointed organist of the Speyer Cathedral, a post he held until his death four years later.

References

1809 births
1843 deaths
German organists
German male organists
19th-century German composers
19th-century German male musicians
19th-century organists